Sauipe is a district in the municipality of Mata de São João, on the northern coast of the state of Bahia, in Brazil. There are few permanent residents there, due to the very high cost of residences and the fact that almost the entire area is filled with hotels and resorts, which form the largest tourist complex in Brazil.

The district name is a reference to the local namesake river.

Turismo

Sauipe is recognized for the complex Costa do Sauipe, which is a major tourist hotel development consisting of four resorts. It extends over 176 hectares and is 76 kilometers from Salvador Airport.

Due to its size, it has already received events such as the Brasil Open of Tennis from 2001 to 2011, the 2001 Beach Soccer World Championship, the XXXVI Ordinary Meeting of the Mercosur Common Market Council and the 2014 FIFA World Cup draw.

Next to the tourist complex, Eco Parque Sauipe is located, which attracts by the biodiversity of the ecosystem of the conjunction between small stretches of restinga and mangroves surrounded by the Atlantic Forest, all in 66 hectares.

References

External links

 Official website of Costa do Sauipe (in Portuguese)

Bahia